Scott Michael Chiamparino (born August 22, 1966) is an American former pitcher in Major League Baseball who played for the Texas Rangers from  to . He was drafted by the Florida Marlins as the 41st pick overall in the 1992 MLB expansion draft. He struck Brook Jacoby out looking for his first Major League strikeout.

References

External links

Medford A's players
Modesto A's players
Huntsville Stars players
Tacoma Tigers players
Gulf Coast Rangers players
Charlotte Rangers players
Tulsa Drillers players
Oklahoma City 89ers players
Las Vegas Stars (baseball) players
Major League Baseball pitchers
Baseball players from California
Texas Rangers players
1966 births
Living people
Anchorage Bucs players
Junípero Serra High School (San Mateo, California) alumni